Buckhorn is a census-designated place in Grant County, New Mexico, United States. Its population was 200 as of the 2010 census. Buckhorn has a post office with ZIP code 88025. U.S. Route 180 passes through the community. The post office was established in 1913. Buckhorn was named for the nearby Buckhorn Creek.

Demographics

References

Census-designated places in New Mexico
Census-designated places in Grant County, New Mexico